The Ministry of Agriculture is the central government ministry of Sri Lanka responsible for agriculture. The ministry is responsible for formulating and implementing national policy on home affairs and other subjects which come under its purview. The current Minister of Agriculture is Mahinda Amaraweera. The ministry's secretary is B. Wijayaratne.

Ministers
The Minister of Agriculture is a member of the Cabinet of Sri Lanka.

Key objectives 
The key objective of the Ministry of agriculture is to:

 Supportive agricultural policy for food and allied agricultural crops,
 Established food and nutrition security,
 Stable prices for agricultural products,
 Efficiently coordinated paddy purchasing and marketing programme,
 Timely implementation of projects, Increase production in selected crops,
 Efficient and effective implementation of accelerated food production programme,
 Efficient and effective use of foreign funds,
 Customer friendly and result oriented administrative system,
 Results-based management in entire government sector. 65

Secretaries

References

External links
 

 
Sri Lanka
Agriculture
Agriculture
1931 establishments in Ceylon
Agricultural organisations based in Sri Lanka
Members of the Board of Ministers of Ceylon